A feminist art magazine is a publication whose main topic is feminist art or feminist art criticism. They can be in print form, online, or both. They may be aimed at different audiences, including academic institutions, galleries, buyers, amateur or professional artists and the general public. Feminist art magazines can be academic journals or consumer magazines.

Notable feminist art magazines include:

Current 

Camera Obscura, est. 1976, triannual, Duke University Press
Femspec, est. 1999, Cleveland, Ohio, interdisciplinary feminist fiction journal
LTTR, est. 2001, annual, gender queer feminist art journal
M/E/A/N/I/N/G, in print 1986 to 1996, now online
Meridians: Feminism, Race, Transnationalism, est. 2000, Smith College, Northampton, Massachusetts, interdisciplinary peer-reviewed feminist journal
n.paradoxa: international feminist art journal, est. 1996, biannual, covering feminist art criticism and the work of contemporary women artists
Payam-e-Zan (Women's Message), 1981, Afghanistan, founded by Meena Keshwar Kamal
Sinister Wisdom, est. 1976, triannual; the oldest surviving lesbian literary magazine
tender, est. 2013, United Kingdom, online quarterly journal of literary art by female-identified writers
Velvetpark, in print 2002 to 2007, now online
Woman's Art Journal, biannual journal focused on women artists and issues related to women in the arts, Old City Publishing, Inc.
Women & Performance: a journal of feminist theory, est. 1983, Department of Performance Studies at New York University’s Tisch School of the Arts, interdisciplinary journal of feminist performance theory
Women's Art Register Bulletin, est. 1988, published by the Women's Art Register, Melbourne

Not in publication 
Amazon Quarterly, feminist lesbian arts periodical, 1972 to 1975, United States
At the Crossroads: A Journal for Women Artists of African Descent, 1992 to 1997, Toronto, Ontario, founded by Karen Miranda Augustine
The Blatant Image: a Magazine of Feminist Photography, 1981 to 1983, Oregon
Chrysalis, 1977 to 1980, Los Angeles
The Creative Woman, 1977 to 1992, published by Governors State University
FAN: feminist arts news, 1980 to 1993, Leeds, United Kingdom
The Feminist Art Journal, 1972 to 1977, New York; the first stable, widely read journal of its kind
Heresies: A Feminist Publication on Art and Politics, 1977–1992, New York
Hot Flashes, 1993 to 1994, quarterly newsletter of the anonymous female artists group Guerrilla Girls
Hue Points: Women's Caucus for Art Newsmagazine, 1982 to 1986, Phoenix, Arizona
Hurricane Alice, 1983 to 1985, Minneapolis, Minneapolis
Lip magazine, 1975–1983, Melbourne, Australia
Makara, 1975 to 1978, Vancouver, British Columbia
MAKE Magazine, 1983 to 2002; began as Women Artists Slide Library, then became Women's Art Magazine, before becoming MAKE
Matriart, 1990 to 1998, Women's Art Resource Center, Toronto, Ontario
Time and Tide, 1920 to 1986, London, United Kingdom
Women Artists Newsletter/Women Artists News, established in 1978 and in print until January 1991; WAN was a feminist art newsletter based in New York City.

References

Visual arts magazines
Lists of magazines
Feminist magazines
Feminism-related lists